The Gospel of Grace Church (Chinese: 福音堂) also known as Grace Evangelical Church is an independent Chinese Christian church founded in Shandong by Xi Sheng-Mo (席胜魔) in 1881. In 1906, Yu Zong-Zhou (俞宗周) established this church in Shanghai. This was one of the earliest indigenous churches established by local Chinese Christians.

External links
Gospel of Grace Church in Nanping, Meishan 

Religious organizations established in 1881
1881 establishments in China
Chinese Independent Churches
Evangelical denominations in Asia